Petchdam Petchyindee Academy (born May 25, 1998), is a Thai Muay Thai fighter. Petchdam is a former ONE Flyweight Kickboxing World Champion. He is also a former Lumpinee Stadium bantamweight champion, Thailand bantamweight champion, Toyota Marathon featherweight champion, and WBC Muaythai world featherweight champion.

Career

ONE Championship
Petchdam Petchyindee Academy made his ONE Super Series debut on July 18, 2018 at ONE Championship: Pursuit of Power, where he knocked out Australian Josh Tonna in the 2nd round. His next appearance on ONE Championship was in his home country of Thailand at ONE Championship: Kingdom of Heroes on October 6, 2018, where he scored a 1st-round knockout over Kenny Tse. Petchdam would continue his run of dominance in ONE Super Series in 2019 when he faced Masahide Kudo at ONE Championship: Call to Greatness on February 22. He knocked out Kudo in 35 seconds of the 2nd round. 

In what would be his biggest test in ONE Championship, Petchdam Petchyindee Academy faced Algerian Elias Mahmoudi for the inaugural ONE Flyweight Kickboxing World Championship at ONE Championship: Warriors of Light. Despite a slow start to the fight, having to fight under kickboxing rules, Petchdam would slowly find his rhythm. An accidental low kick from Petchdam in the fourth round would render Mahmoudi unable to continue. Petchdam would win the title via technical decision. 

In his first title defense at ONE Championship: Dreams of Gold on August 16, 2019, Petchdam Petchyindee Academy would face Dutch-Moroccan kickboxer Ilias Ennahachi. Being overwhelmed by Ennahachi's punching combinations, Petchdam was knocked down in the second round. In the third round, a left hook from Ennahachi sent him down for a second time and Petchdam ultimately lost the fight and the title via 3rd-round knockout. This would also mark his first loss in ONE Championship.

In his first fight since losing the ONE Kickboxing Flyweight World Title, Petchdam will face Kohei "Momotaro" Kodera at ONE Championship: Fire & Fury on January 31, 2020. After a slow start in the first round, he would defeat Momotaro by majority decision.

On July 31, 2020, Petchdam faced Rodtang Jitmuangnon in a trilogy fight for the ONE Flyweight Muay Thai World Championship at ONE Championship: No Surrender. Despite Rodtang injuring his hand early in the fight, Petchdam was unable to overcome his opponent's pressure and lost the fight by majority decision.

Petchdam faced Taiki Naito at ONE Championship: Revolution on September 24, 2021. He lost the close bout via split decision.

Due to a disagreement between his gym, Petchyindee Academy, and ONE Championship, all Petchyindee fighters were released from the promotion at the request of the gym.

Titles and accomplishments
Lumpinee Stadium 
2015 Lumpinee Bantamweight 118lbs Champion 

Professional Boxing Association of Thailand (PAT)
2015 Thailand Bantamweight 118lbs Champion

Toyota Marathon
2017 Toyota Marathon 126lbs Champion

WBC Muaythai
2018 WBC Muaythai World Featherweight (126lbs) Champion

ONE Championship 
2019 ONE Flyweight Kickboxing World Champion

True4U Petchyindee
 2020 True4U Lightweight Champion

Awards
 2022 Rajadamnern Stadium Fight of the Year (vs. Chorfah Tor.Sangtiennoi)

Fight record

|-  style="background:#cfc;"
| 2023-03-11|| Win ||align=left| Kompatak SinbiMuayThai || RWS + Petchyindee, Rajadamnern Stadium || Bangkok, Thailand || Decision (Split) ||3  || 3:00
|-  style="background:#fbb;"
| 2023-01-28|| Loss ||align=left| Chalam Parunchai ||Suek Muay Mahakuson Samakom Chao Paktai  || Bangkok, Thailand ||Decision  ||5 ||3:00
|-  style="background:#cfc"
| 2022-12-28 || Win ||align=left| Flukenoi Kiatfahlikit || Muay Thai Rakya Soosakon + SAT Super Fight Withee Tin Thai + Petchyindee  || Bangkok, Thailand || Decision (Unanimous)|| 5 ||3:00
|-  style="background:#c5d2ea"
| 2022-10-29 || Draw ||align=left| Duangsompong Jitmuangnon || 9Muaydee VitheeThai, Or.Tor.Gor.3 Stadium  || Nonthaburi province, Thailand || Decision || 5 ||3:00
|-  style="background:#c5d2ea;"
| 2022-08-25 || Draw||align=left| Chorfah Tor.Sangtiennoi ||Petchyindee, Rajadamnern Stadium || Bangkok, Thailand || Decision || 5 ||3:00
|-  style="background:#cfc;"
| 2022-07-15|| Win ||align=left| Kimluay SorJor.TongPrachin || Muaymanwansuk, Rangsit Stadium ||Rangsit, Thailand || Decision || 5 || 3:00
|-  style="background:#cfc;"
| 2022-05-05|| Win ||align=left| Kanongsuek NayokTom-Gor.Kampanat || Petchyindee, Rajadamnern Stadium ||Bangkok, Thailand || TKO || 3 || 1:10 
|-  style="background:#fbb;"
| 2022-02-17|| Loss ||align=left| Flukenoi Kiatfahlikit|| Petchyindee, Rajadamnern Stadium || Bangkok, Thailand || Decision || 5|| 3:00 
|-
! style=background:white colspan=9 |
|-  style="background:#cfc;"
| 2021-11-26|| Win ||align=left| Nuathoranee Samchaivisetsuk || Muay Thai Moradok Kon Thai + Rajadamnern Super Fight || Buriram, Thailand || Decision || 5 || 3:00
|-  style="background:#fbb;"
| 2021-09-24|| Loss ||align=left| Taiki Naito || ONE Championship: Revolution ||  Kallang, Singapore || Decision (Split) || 3 || 3:00
|-  style="background:#fbb;"
| 2021-04-08|| Loss||align=left| Duangsompong Jitmuangnon || SuekMahakamMuayRuamPonKon Chana + Petchyindee|| Songkhla Province, Thailand || Decision || 5 || 3:00
|-  style="background:#cfc;"
| 2021-03-05|| Win ||align=left| Ploywittiya Petsimuen || Muaymanwansuk, Rangsit Stadium || Rangsit, Thailand || Decision || 5 || 3:00
|-  style="background:#cfc;"
| 2020-10-16|| Win ||align=left| Chatpayak Chor.Hapayak || Muaymanwansuk, Rangsit Stadium || Rangsit, Thailand || TKO || 5 ||  
|-
! style=background:white colspan=9 |
|-  style="background:#fbb;"
| 2020-07-31|| Loss ||align=left| Rodtang Jitmuangnon || ONE Championship: No Surrender || Bangkok, Thailand || Decision (Majority) || 5 || 3:00   
|-
! style=background:white colspan=9 |
|-  style="background:#cfc;"
| 2020-01-31|| Win ||align=left| Kohei "Momotaro" Kodera || ONE Championship: Fire & Fury || Pasay, Philippines || Decision (Majority) || 3 || 3:00
|-  style="background:#cfc;"
| 2019-12-22|| Win ||align=left| Michael Garraffo || Rajadamnern Stadium || Bangkok, Thailand || KO || 2 ||
|- style="background:#fbb;"
| 2019-08-16|| Loss|| align="left" | Ilias Ennahachi || ONE Championship: Dreams of Gold || Bangkok, Thailand|| KO (Left hook) || 3 || 1:00
|-
! style=background:white colspan=9 |
|- style="background:#cfc;"
| 2019-05-10|| Win|| align="left" | Elias Mahmoudi || ONE Championship: Warriors Of Light || Bangkok, Thailand|| Technical Decision || 5 || 0:29
|-
! style=background:white colspan=9 |
|-  style="background:#cfc;"
| 2019-02-22|| Win ||align=left| Masahide Kudo || ONE Championship: Call to Greatness || Kallang, Singapore || KO (Left Cross) || 2 || 0:35
|-  style="background:#fbb;"
| 2018-12-26|| Loss ||align=left| Detsakda Sitsongpeenong || Rajadamnern Stadium || Bangkok, Thailand || Decision || 5 || 3:00
|-  style="background:#fbb;"
| 2018-11-22|| Loss ||align=left| Rungkit Wor.Sanprapai || Rajadamnern Stadium || Bangkok, Thailand || Decision || 5 || 3:00
|-  style="background:#cfc;"
| 2018-10-06|| Win ||align=left| Kenny Tse || ONE Championship: Kingdom of Heroes || Bangkok, Thailand || KO (High Kick) || 1 || 1:26
|-  style="background:#c5d2ea;"
| 2018-08-09|| Draw ||align=left| Mongkolchai Kwaitonggym || Rajadamnern Stadium || Bangkok, Thailand || Decision || 5 || 3:00
|-  style="background:#cfc;"
| 2018-07-13|| Win ||align=left| Josh Tonna || ONE Championship: Pursuit of Power || Kuala Lumpur, Malaysia || KO (High Kick) || 2 || 1:11
|-  style="background:#fbb;"
| 2018-06-07|| Loss ||align=left| Rungkit Wor.Sanprapai || Rajadamnern Stadium || Bangkok, Thailand || Decision || 5 || 3:00
|-  style="background:#cfc;"
| 2018-05-09|| Win ||align=left| Rungkit Wor.Sanprapai || Rajadamnern Stadium || Bangkok, Thailand || Decision || 5 || 3:00 
|-  bgcolor="#cfc"
! style=background:white colspan=9 |
|-  style="background:#cfc;"
| 2018-03-17|| Win ||align=left| Markus Kalberg || Topking World Series || Thailand || Decision || 3 || 3:00
|-  style="background:#fbb;"
| 2018-02-08|| Loss ||align=left| Rodtang Jitmuangnon || Rajadamnern Stadium || Bangkok, Thailand || Decision || 5 || 3:00
|-  style="background:#fbb;"
| 2018-01-18|| Loss ||align=left| Chanasuek Kor.Kampanat || Rajadamnern Stadium || Bangkok, Thailand || Decision || 5 || 3:00
|-  style="background:#cfc;"
| 2017-11-24|| Win ||align=left| VIP FighterMuayTha || Toyota Marathon Tournament || Bangkok, Thailand || Decision || 5 || 3:00 
|-  bgcolor="#cfc"
! style=background:white colspan=9 |
|-  style="background:#cfc;"
| 2017-11-24|| Win ||align=left| Petchsongkom Sitjaroensub || Toyota Marathon Tournament || Bangkok, Thailand || Decision || 5 || 3:00
|-  style="background:#fbb;"
| 2017-11-01|| Loss ||align=left| Suakim PK Saenchaimuaythaigym || Rajadamnern Stadium || Bangkok, Thailand || Decision || 5 || 3:00
|-  style="background:#cfc;"
| 2017-09-04|| Win ||align=left| Klasuek Phetjinda || Rajadamnern Stadium || Bangkok, Thailand || Decision || 5 || 3:00
|-  style="background:#cfc;"
| 2017-05-31|| Win ||align=left| Petchtaksin Sor Sommai || Rajadamnern Stadium || Bangkok, Thailand || Decision || 5 || 3:00
|-  style="background:#cfc;"
| 2017-05-04|| Win ||align=left| Rodtang Jitmuangnon || Rajadamnern Stadium || Bangkok, Thailand || Decision || 5 || 3:00
|-  style="background:#fbb;"
| 2017-03-02|| Loss ||align=left| Phetwason Ansukumvit || Rajadamnern Stadium || Bangkok, Thailand || Decision || 5 || 3:00
|-  style="background:#cfc;"
| 2017-02-20|| Win ||align=left| Kundiew Payapkumpan || Rangsit Boxing Stadium || Rangsit, Thailand || Decision || 5 || 3:00
|-  style="background:#fbb;"
| 2017-02-02|| Loss ||align=left| Suakim PK Saenchaimuaythaigym || Rajadamnern Stadium || Bangkok, Thailand || Decision || 5 || 3:00
|-  style="background:#cfc;"
| 2016-12-09|| Win ||align=left| Sing Parunchai || Lumpinee Stadium || Bangkok, Thailand || KO || 4 ||
|-  style="background:#cfc;"
| 2016-11-14|| Win ||align=left| Sing Parunchai || Rajadamnern Stadium || Bangkok, Thailand || Decision || 5 || 3:00
|-  style="background:#fbb;"
| 2016-09-29|| Loss ||align=left| Phetnamngam Aor.Kwanmuang || Rajadamnern Stadium || Bangkok, Thailand || Decision || 5 || 3:00
|-  style="background:#cfc;"
| 2016-09-04|| Win ||align=left| Manasak Pinsinchai || Rajadamnern Stadium || Bangkok, Thailand || Decision || 5 || 3:00
|-  style="background:#cfc;"
| 2016-07-14|| Win ||align=left| Petsila Chor.Sampinong || Rajadamnern Stadium || Bangkok, Thailand || Decision || 5 || 3:00
|-  style="background:#fbb;"
| 2016-05-28|| Loss ||align=left| Kwanphet Sor.Suwanpakdee || Rangsit Stadium || Bangkok, Thailand || Decision || 5 || 3:00
|-  style="background:#cfc;"
| 2016-04-30|| Win ||align=left| Tomas Sor.Chaijarern || Rangsit Stadium || Rangsit, Thailand || Decision || 5 || 3:00
|-  style="background:#fbb;"
| 2016-03-26|| Loss ||align=left| Phetsila Chor.Sampinong || Rangsit Stadium || Rangsit, Thailand || Decision || 5 || 3:00
|-  style="background:#cfc;"
| 2016-01-06|| Win ||align=left| Saksit Tor.Paopiumsub || Rajadamnern Stadium || Bangkok, Thailand || Decision || 5 || 3:00
|-  style="background:#cfc;"
| 2015-12-08|| Win ||align=left| Khunhan Sitthongsak || Lumpinee Stadium || Bangkok, Thailand || TKO|| 5 ||  
|-  bgcolor="#cfc"
! style=background:white colspan=9 |
|-  style="background:#cfc;"
| 2015-11-06|| Win ||align=left|  Morakot Komsaimai || Lumpinee Stadium || Bangkok, Thailand || TKO ||  ||
|-  style="background:#cfc;"
| 2015-10-15|| Win ||align=left| Revo Bangkok-Alaiyont || Rajadamnern Stadium || Thailand || KO || 1 ||
|-  style="background:#cfc;"
| 2015-09-08|| Win ||align=left| Yodasawin SinbiMuayThai || Lumpinee Stadium || Thailand || Decision || 5 || 3:00
|-  style="background:#fbb;"
| 2015-08-11|| Loss ||align=left| Morakot Petchsimuen || Lumpinee Stadium || Thailand || KO || 4 ||
|-  style="background:#cfc;"
| 2015-07-08|| Win ||align=left| Kongpop Thor.Pran49 || Rajadamnern Stadium || Thailand || KO || 4 ||
|-  style="background:#cfc;"
| 2015-05-23|| Win ||align=left| Weraphonlek Wor.Wanchai || Siam Omnoi Boxing Stadium || Thailand || Decision || 5 || 3:00
|-  style="background:#cfc;"
| 2015-03-29|| Win ||align=left| Denputhai Kiatmoo9 || Rajadamnern Stadium || Bangkok, Thailand || TKO || 4 ||
|-  style="background:#cfc;"
| 2014-12-14|| Win ||align=left| Denputhai Kiatmoo9 || Rangsit Stadium || Rangsit, Thailand || Decision || 5 || 3:00
|-  style="background:#cfc;"
| 2014-09-17|| Win ||align=left| Nampon Phuket Top Team || Rajadamnern Stadium || Bangkok, Thailand || Decision || 5 || 3:00 
|-
| colspan=9 | Legend:

References

1998 births
living people
Petchdam Petchyindee Academy
Petchdam Petchyindee Academy
ONE Championship kickboxers
ONE Championship champions